Omar Reiss Rowe (born 30 October 1994) is an English footballer who plays as a winger for Chesham United on loan from Farnborough.

Club career
Rowe was born in Hackney, London, and spent the first part of his youth development at West Ham United, but moved to Southampton at under-16 level. Along with goalkeeper Will Britt, he signed his professional deal with Southampton on 1 July 2013. He made his debut for the club in the Second Round of the League Cup against Barnsley on 27 August 2013, replacing Lloyd Isgrove in the 72nd minute of a 5–1 away win.

At the start of the 2015–16 season, he joined Essex Senior League club Tower Hamlets on a part-time basis. On 15 October 2015, Rowe joined National League South club Bishop's Stortford. His contract with Bishop's Stortford was terminated in January 2016. In February 2016, Rowe appeared for Woodford Town, making two league appearances, scoring twice against Wodson Park and Southall.

In 2016, Rowe arrived in Cyprus, joining APOEL and began playing football at Cypriot Third Division club Ethnikos Latsion on a season-long loan, before moving up a tier a year later to play for Ayia Napa. In 2018, Rowe signed for newly promoted Cypriot First Division club Enosis Neon Paralimni.

He rejoined Ayia Napa in January 2019, making his second debut as a substitute in the 1–0 loss to Anagennisi Deryneia on 5 January.

In summer 2019, Rowe returned to England and joined Hayes & Yeading United.

In November 2020, Rowe joined National League South side Hemel Hempstead Town on a one-month loan deal.

After three years at Hayes & Yeading, Rowe joined newly-promoted National League South side, Farnborough ahead of the 2022–23 campaign.

In December 2022, Rowe joined Chesham United on loan until the end of the season.

Personal life
Rowe's brother O'Neal Rowe played alongside him at Tower Hamlets and Woodford Town. Rowe's younger brother, Aaron, plays for Huddersfield Town.

Career statistics

References

External links

Stats at Cyprus FA
Hayes & Yeading stats

1994 births
Living people
Footballers from the London Borough of Hackney
Black British sportspeople
English footballers
Association football wingers
West Ham United F.C. players
Southampton F.C. players
Tower Hamlets F.C. players
Bishop's Stortford F.C. players
Woodford Town F.C. players
APOEL FC players
Ethnikos Latsion FC players
Ayia Napa FC players
Enosis Neon Paralimni FC players
Hayes & Yeading United F.C. players
Farnborough F.C. players
English expatriate footballers
English expatriate sportspeople in Cyprus
Expatriate footballers in Cyprus
National League (English football) players
Cypriot Second Division players
Cypriot First Division players
Essex Senior Football League players
Chesham United F.C. players
Southern Football League players